Anthony Cope (1713–1764) was Dean of Armagh from 1753 until his death.

Cope was born in Loughgall and educated at Trinity College, Dublin. He was Rector of Tartaraghan from 1739 until his death in April 1764.

Family 
He was the son of Robert Cope and the uncle of Robert Camden Cope.

References

See also 

 Cope family

1764 deaths
Deans of Armagh
18th-century Irish Anglican priests
Alumni of Trinity College Dublin
1713 births
People from County Armagh